Michael Steel or Mike Steel may refer to:

People
Mike Steel (mathematician) (born 1960), professor in New Zealand
Michael Steel, official of English company Hybrid Air Vehicles Ltd
Miljenko Matijevic (born 1964), Croatian-American rock vocalist for the band Steelheart, also known as Mikey Steel
Michael von Steel, actor on the gay vampire television series The Lair

Characters
Michael Steel, a fictional character in the 1942 film Little Tokyo, U.S.A.
Michael "Mike" Steel, a fictional character in the 2001 film The Hole
Ironclad (comics), also known as Michael Steel, a fictional character in the Marvel comic universe
Michael Steel, a fictional character in the heavy-metal album The Crimson Idol

See also
Michael Steele (disambiguation)